De Tjongermolen  is a smock mill in Mildam, Friesland, Netherlands which was built in 1918, replacing a mill that had blown down and rebuilt on a new site in 1983. The mill has been restored to working order. It is listed as a Rijksmonument.

History
A mill was built nearby in 1869. It blew down in 1918 and was rebuilt. The mill worked until 1950, after which it became derelict. The mill was sold to Stichting De Fryske Mole on 4 March 1983, becoming the 33rd mill owned by the society. It was moved to a new site nearby, and restored at a cost of ƒ220,000. The restoration, which resulted in a smaller mill than the original, was completed on 21 October 1983. The mill was restored again in the summer of 2012. A new cap and sails were fitted. De Tjongermolen is listed as a Rijksmonument, number 511214.

Description

De Tjongermolen is what the Dutch describe as a Grondzeiler. It is a one storey smock mill on a single storey brick base. There is no stage, the sails reaching almost to ground level. The mill is winded by tailpole and winch. The smock and cap are boarded. The sails are Common sails. The sails are carried on a wood windshaft. It also carries the brake wheel which has 43 cogs. This drives the wallower (22 cogs) at  the top of the upright shaft. At the bottom of the upright shaft there are two crown wheels The upper crown wheel, which has 33 cogs drives an Archimedes' screw via a crown wheel. The lower crown wheel, which has 32 cogs is carried on the axle of an Archimedes' screw, which was used to drain the polder. The screw is  diameter. It is inclined at 24.5°. Each revolution of the screw lifts  of water.

Public access
De Tjongermolen is open to the public by appointment.

References

Windmills in Friesland
Windmills completed in 1983
Smock mills in the Netherlands
Windpumps in the Netherlands
Agricultural buildings in the Netherlands
Rijksmonuments in Friesland
Octagonal buildings in the Netherlands